In association football, work rate refers to the extent to which a player contributes to running and chasing in a match while not in possession of the ball.

Work rate is generally indicated by the distance covered by a player during a match. An example of a player with a high work rate is Xavi, a former midfielder for Barcelona and Spain. During the final of the 2010–11 UEFA Champions League, Xavi ran almost 12 km, more than any other player in the game. The same is true of the final of the 2010 FIFA World Cup, when he covered a distance of 14.98 km (including extra time).

A high work rate is valued because players with this characteristic will be able to play a more active role in defending and attacking throughout a match. Conversely, players are sometimes criticized for low work rate; for instance, ESPN Soccernet correspondent Sam Limbert highlighted a poor work rate as one of the weaker qualities of Arsenal midfielder Denílson Pereira Neves.

However, some experts, such as former Brazil and São Paulo youth coach Carlos de Lorenzi, warn against the danger of equating high work rate with high talent. De Lorenzi had responsibility for the early development of such players as Brazilian star Kaká.

References 

Association football terminology
Association football tactics
Rates